"Sensitize" is a 1991 single by That Petrol Emotion.

Track listing 7"

Track listing CD single

Track listing 10" (Limited Edition)

Personnel
Per the album liner notes.
 Scott Litt - producer, "Sensitize" and "Gnaw Mark"
Steve Mack - producer, "Chemicrazy (Revitalised)"
That Petrol Emotion - producers, "Chemicrazy (Revitalised)"
Roli Mosimann - producer, "Groove Check (The Stoli Mix)"
Roli Mosimann - producer  "Groove Check (Check This Groove Out)"
Ben Aguiar - remixing,  "Groove Check (Check This Groove Out)"

References

1990 songs
That Petrol Emotion songs
Virgin Records singles
Song recordings produced by Scott Litt